The Merchant of Venice is a 1953 French-Italian drama film directed by Pierre Billon and starring Michel Simon, Andrée Debar and Massimo Serato. It is loosely based on  William Shakespeare's  Elizabethan play of the same name.

The film's sets were designed by the art director Giancarlo Bartolini Salimbeni.

Plot 
In order to come to the aid of his friend Bassanio, the wealthy merchant Antonio, while awaiting the imminent arrival of his ships, is obliged to ask the usurer Shylock to advance him a sum of money. The latter accepts, on the condition that, if the loan is not returned on time, he will pay himself by taking a pound of flesh from his creditor.

Cast 
 Michel Simon as Shylock
 Andrée Debar as  Portia
 Massimo Serato as  Antonio
 Armando Francioli as  Bassanio
 Giorgio Albertazzi as  Lorenzo
 Liliana Tellini as  Jessica
 Olga Solbelli  as  Bianca
 Clara Auteri Pepe as Nerissa
 Franco Balducci as Antonio's Friend
 Nerio Bernardi as Doge 
 Gualtiero Tumiati  as Dr. Bellario

References

Bibliography
 Burt, Richard. Shakespeares After Shakespeare: An Encyclopedia of the Bard in Mass Media and Popular Culture, Volume 1. Greenwood Press, 2007.

External links

1953 films
1953 drama films
Films based on The Merchant of Venice
Films scored by Giovanni Fusco
French drama films
French films based on plays
Italian drama films
Italian films based on plays
French black-and-white films
Italian black-and-white films
Films directed by Pierre Billon
1950s French-language films
1950s French films
1950s Italian films